is a Japanese anime series and the eighth installment in Izumi Todo's Pretty Cure metaseries. Produced by Toei Animation, the series is directed by Munehisa Sakai, who directed the One Piece anime series. Character designs were by Akira Takahashi, who previously worked on Kaidan Restaurant. The series aired on TV Asahi's ANN network between February 6, 2011 and January 29, 2012, replacing HeartCatch PreCure! in its initial timeslot and was succeeded by Smile PreCure! A manga adaptation by Futago Kamikita was serialised in Kodansha's monthly Nakayoshi magazine.

The main topics of the series are music (the second to do so after HeartCatch PreCure!), which influences the names of the Cures and the magical devices they use, as well as friendship, as emphasized by two of its characters: Hibiki Hojo and Kanade Minamino.

Plot 
In a place called Major Land, the "Melody of Happiness" is due to be played, spreading happiness throughout the world. However, an evil man named Mephisto steals the Legendary Score, plotting to turn it into the "Melody of Sorrow" to spread sadness across the land. Aphrodite, the queen of Major Land, scatters the Notes that make up the Legendary Score into the human world and sends a fairy named Hummy to Kanon Town in order to recover them. There, Hummy meets two girls, Hibiki Hojo and Kanade Minamino, who are chosen to become the Suite Pretty Cures in order to recover the missing Notes and protect everyone's happiness.

Characters

Suite Pretty Cures 

  
 Voiced by Ami Koshimizu 
 The main protagonist. Hibiki is born to a rich family and is a 14-year-old student in the second year of Private Aria Academy junior high. She has a bright personality, excels at sports and volunteers in sport clubs, but isn't very good at schoolwork. Although her parents are musical celebrities, Hibiki thinks she has no musical talent even though she has absolute pitch. She played piano as a kid, but stopped for when she felt she let her father down after a performance. She also loves to eat sweet things, particularly the cakes from Kanade's family's shop.
 After meeting Siren, her potential as a Pretty Cure was awakened when she and Kanade were rendered immune to Siren's attack, and through her musical score, she transforms into Cure Melody. As Cure Melody, her normally brown-orange hair tints light pink and becomes tied in extra long twintails and her Fairy Tone is Dory. Her main weapon is the Miracle Belltier, which uses the Fairy Tone, Miry. In the movie, she gains an upgrade, Crescendo Mode, granted by Crescendo Tone, and in episode 47, all four members become Crescendo Pretty Cures.
Her theme color is pink.

  
 
 The sub protagonist. Kanade is 13-year-old and also a student in the second year of Private Aria Academy junior high. She is Hibiki's childhood friend and classmate. Kanade is an excellent student, but she is not good at sports like Hibiki. Her excellent grades and personality make her sort of a celebrity in her school. Kanade acts very mature, but she is sometimes stubborn. She belongs to the Sweets Club in Aria Academy. She dreams of becoming a pastry chef when she grows up and taking over her parents' pastry shop, the Lucky Spoon. She has a crush on the school's prince of music, Ouji. She also has a strong love for cats, especially Hummy, whose paw she likes to touch. However, in later episodes, she completely loses prominence in the series, thus turning her into a major character.
 Her potential as a Pretty Cure was awakened when she and Hibiki were rendered immune to Siren's attack, and through her musical score, she transforms into Cure Rhythm. As Cure Rhythm, her normally-dirty blonde hair tints platinum blonde and becomes knee-length, and her Fairy Tone is Rery. Her main weapon is the Fantastic Belltier, which uses the Fairy Tone, Fary.
Her theme color is white.

   
 
 Siren is a female Cat-like "Fairy of Songs" and Mephisto's former assistant. Although she was born in Major Land and is friends with Hummy, she became jealous when her title of the annual singer of the "Melody of Happiness" was given to Hummy instead and asked to be Mephisto's right-hand. As Siren, she has powerful abilities and can create Negatones using her dark powers. She can also use the powers of her necklace to take the form of any person she wishes. In her normal human form, known as Ellen, she is a 14-year-old strong fighter and can materialize notes to use as projectiles.
 During Episode 21, her potential of Pretty Cure was awakened as she wanted to protect Hummy, who is captured by the Minor Trio. This caused her necklace to shatter, trapping her in human form of Eren Kurokawa and causing her to lose her power of transformation. After joining up with the Cures, she begins living with the Shirabes and attends school with Hibiki and Kanade. As Cure Beat, her dark purple hair turns bright purple and gains a side ponytail, and her Fairy Tone is Lary. Her main weapon is the Love Guitar Rod, which uses the Fairy Tone, Sory. She is unique to the Pretty Cure franchise as being a former mascot and antagonist that later became a Pretty Cure.
Her theme color is blue.

  
 
 Ako is a 9-year-old student in the third year of Public Kanon Elementary, who is in the same class as Kanade's younger brother, Souta. She is very mature for her age, but also very cold and not above lecturing her elders, particularly Hibiki and Kanade. Unbeknownst to the Pretty Cures, she had masked herself as a mysterious fighter named Cure Muse who aids them using colorful piano keys to form barriers and restraints. She often assists the Pretty Cures if they are trapped, but leaves them to finish off the Negatones. She hides her status under the mask and does not speak, as her Fairy Tone partner, Dodory, does all the talking. She often declares that she will not partner herself with the Cures until the time is right.
 During Episode 35, she reveals herself to be Major Land's princess, the daughter of Aphrodite and Mephisto. After her father goes missing, she runs away to Kanon Town and disguises herself, living with her grandfather, Otokichi. When Mephisto steals the Legendary Score, Ako's potential as a Pretty Cure awakens. As Cure Muse, her short orange hair grows to knee-length and gains two yellow ribbons on each end, and her Fairy Tone is Dodory. She doesn't have a main weapon, but she uses her secondary Fairy Tone, Shiry for her purification attacks. She is the youngest Pretty Cure in the franchise just before Cure Ace.
Black Muse's theme color is black, and Cure Muse's theme color is the costume is yellow but it can be taken as purple from the transformation item.

Major Land 

 
 
 Hummy is a female Cat-like "Fairy of Songs" and the partner of both Kanade and Hibiki. She is the singer of the "Melody of Happiness" this year, who tries to oppose Mephisto. She is sent into the human world to search for and collect the scattered notes of the Melody of Happiness until she meets both Kanade and Hibiki. She is able to use magic by clapping her hands, which she uses to purify Notes that were transformed into Negatones and subsequently defeated by the Pretty Cures. She is also able to use her magic to recover the Cure Modules if they are lost. Hummy is very friendly and close to her childhood friend, Siren. Even after Siren betrays her and her nation, she does not see her as a foe, which often causes trouble for the Cures.

 
 

Eight special jewel-like fairies that came from Major Land along with Hummy. These fairies give Pretty Cure special abilities and powers when used by inserting them into their Cure Modules and Cure Belltiers. They are also in charge of collecting the scattered notes of the Melody of Happiness. Each of the Fairy Tone's names (excluding Crescendo Tone) are based on the Solfège scale (Do, Re, Mi, Fa, So, La, Shi, Do).

  - Pink fairy. Allows Hibiki to transform into Cure Melody. When played in a Cure Module, it allows its user to have sweet dreams.
  - White fairy. Allows Kanade to transform into Cure Rhythm. When played in a Cure Module, it renews its user's willpower.
  - Orange fairy. Allows Cure Melody to summon her Miracle Belltier.
  - Yellow fairy. Allows Cure Rhythm to summon her Fantastic Belltier.
  - Green fairy. Allows Cure Beat to summon her Love Guitar Rod. When played in a Cure Module, it powers up the Pretty Cures.
  - Aqua fairy. Allows Siren/Eren to transform into Cure Beat.
  - Blue fairy. Only allows Cure Muse to attack, but no weapon usable.
  - Purple fairy. Allows Ako to transform into Cure Muse. Its origin is still unknown.

 
 
 A large Gold "Fairy of Sounds" responsible for creating all sounds in the world and the other Fairy Tones, who resides in the mystical Healing Chest.

 
 
 The wise and benevolent queen of the nation "Major Land", Ako's mother and Otokichi’s daughter. She hosts the anniversary of the "Melody of Happiness" to pray for the peace of all worlds but is forced to scatter the Notes to protect them from Mephisto. She asks Hummy to go to the human world in search of people who can become Pretty Cures to collect the scattered notes.

 
 
 The mysterious and eccentric tuner in Kanon Town, often found working on the town's organ. He comes and goes like a ghost in any music activity. During episode 36, it is revealed that Ototkichi is Aphrodite's father and Ako’s grandfather, and has kept watch over actions between Pretty Cures and enemies. He loves Ako, his granddaughter, very much and tends to gush with love when she is mentioned. He once fought against Noise and managed to seal him away in a fossil, and has since been working on the organ which can produce saintly notes should he awaken again.

Minor Land 
 
 
 Noise is a powerful bird-like demon and the main antagonist of the series, created from the sorrow of humanity. He is responsible for turning Mephisto evil, as his song can brainwash whoever hears it. Though Otokichi sealed Noise away inside a fossil, Falsetto has been trying to revive him by playing the Melody of Sorrow to draw energy from those who fall into sorrow listening to him. After Noise breaks free from the seal upon hearing an incomplete Melody of Sorrow, he assumes a chick-like form that Ako named , which he used to get close to the Cures and steal their Notes. However, he was soon discovered to be Noise after attempting to attack Otokichi. Once the Melody of Sorrows is completed, so too is Noise's resurrection. He resumes his attack on Major Land, and after absorbing Bassdrum and Baritone, assumes a more human-like form to overpower the Cures. However, the Cures manage to purify Noise, who they later find as a newborn chick in Kanon Town, reborn from the joy of humanity.

 
 
 The secondary antagonist of the series, Mephisto is a childish and melodramatic king of the nation "Minor Land". He attempts to make the "Melody of Happiness" into a "Melody of Sorrow" to make all worlds tragic and reflect his musical taste. Mephisto has the power to brainwash others into doing his bidding using headphones that sound the Noise of Evil, but it turns out that he's a victim of the Noise himself, who was Aphrodite's husband and Ako’s father, the prince consort of Major Land. After being ambushed and controlled by Noise when he goes to retrieve the Healing Chest in the cursed forest, he establishes Minor Land. In Episode 36, Ako manages to defeat the evil in his heart and return him back to normal. Like his father-in-law, Mephisto tends to gush about Ako.

 
 The loyal servants of Mephisto. Although they live to serve Mephisto, they often squabble with each other over who gets to be the leader. In episode 26, Mephisto uses the hypnosis earplugs to increase their powers, as well as make more powerful Negatones. While the Trio the Minor came from Major Land and worked for the royalty, only Falsetto willingly allied himself to Noise while Bassdrum and Baritone were placed under the being's spell to serve him. The three were eventually absorbed by Noise, with Falsetto consumed for being annoying while Bassdrum and Baritone sacrificed themselves to protect Hibiki.

 
 
 The bass of "Trio the Minor" who sings in a deep and booming voice. He is the eldest of the three and constantly argues about having bragging rights as leader. After his powers are upgraded, he gains a heightened sense of smell for finding notes. After Falsetto assumes leadership, Bassdrum turns into a frog-like monster, who is prone to inflating.

 
 
 The baritone of "Trio the Minor" who sings in a tenor and mid-ranged voice. He is the most cool-headed, but is quite narcissistic. After his powers are upgraded, he gains superhuman sight, as well as telekinesis. After Falsetto assumes leadership, Baritone turns into a fish-like monster.

 
 
 The tenor of "Trio the Minor" who sings in a high pitched and very off-key voice. After his powers are upgraded, he gains enhanced hearing along with a whip-like weapon. After Mephisto is freed from Noise's spell, Falsetto is revealed to be a willing follower of the Noise of Evil as he takes over Minor Land operations to complete Noise's resurrection. After he assumes leadership, he turns the other two into monsters resembling aquatic animals.

 
 
 The Negatones are the series' monsters of the week, created when a scattered Note is exposed to the Melody of Sorrow. The corrupted note then combines with a nearby item to form a monster that spreads the Melody of Sorrow, causing people to despair. When they are defeated by the Pretty Cures, they return to the original item while the Notes are purified by Hummy and stored inside one of the Fairy Tones.

Minor characters 

 
 
 Hibiki's father, the music teacher of Private Aria Academy and consultant of Orchestra Club. He believes "It's not music if you don't enjoy playing it", which leads Hibiki to feel spited and not get along with him well. He occasionally offers German sayings that confuse those around him.

 
 
 Hibiki's mother, a famous violinist who is constantly on tour overseas, though she occasionally talks to her family via video chat. She is beautiful and confident, making her popular among young boys.

 
 
 Kanade's father, the owner of the "Lucky Spoon" cupcake store. He is active in the development of recipes.

 
 
 Kanade's mother, the client of "Lucky Spoon". She and her spouse endlessly flirt with each other.

 
 
 Kanade's younger brother, Ako's classmate in Public Kanon Elementary. He is somewhat responsible for helping at the "Lucky Spoon" but often acts mischievously and provokes his sister. He is good friends with Ako and cares about her solitude.

 
 
 A third year student of Private Aria Academy, the leader of Orchestra Club. He is very popular with girls, particularly Kanade, who has a crush on him.

 
 
 A student in the third year of Private Aria Academy, the leader of Sweets Club. Her baking ability is the best in the school, earning her the nickname of "The Princess of Sweets".

 
 
 Student in the second year of Private Aria Academy, Hibiki and Kanade's classmate, also Hibiki's partner in all sport clubs. She has blue eyes and short blue spiky hair and is always quick to respond to Hibiki's call.

Movie characters 
The following characters appear in the movie, Suite PreCure♪ The Movie: Take it Back! The Miraculous Melody that Connects Hearts.
 
 
 Ako's friend from school in Major Land.

 
 
 A servant of Noise and the main antagonist of the film, who attempts to stop the Pretty Cures and aid in Noise's revival. He possesses Aphrodite in order to steal all the music in Major Land. He was defeated by Cresendo Melody before the other Cures finish him with Suite Session Assemble Cresendo.

 is a group who serve as Howling's elite minions to help him take all the music away. Their names refer to the type of notes related to the pitch sound.
 
 
 The leader of the Major 3. He can transform into a red dragon-like monster and possesses a fire attack called "Mega Fire".
 
 
 A member of the Major 3. He can transform into a green pig-like monster and shoots fireballs called "Tera Fireball".
 
 
 A member of the Major 3. He can transform into a blue lizard-like monster and uses a lightning attack called "Giga Thunder".

Media

Anime 

The anime began airing on ABC and other ANN stations from February 6, 2011, replacing HeartCatch PreCure! in its previous timeslot.

Aside from the DVD releases, Suite PreCure is the first Pretty Cure series to receive an exclusive Blu-ray Box Set release by Marvelous AQL and TC Entertainment (a group company of Tokyo Broadcasting System Holdings (TBS) and Mainichi Broadcasting System or Chubu-Nippon Broadcasting). Four Blu-ray Box Sets were released between October 28, 2011 and June 22, 2012.

Manga 

A manga adaptation by Futago Kamikita began serialisation in Kodansha's Nakayoshi magazine from March 2011 to February 2012.

Films 

A movie based on the series,  was released in Japanese cinemas on October 29, 2011.

Soundtracks 

The music was composed by Yasuharu Takanashi and the soundtracks are based on the show. The first original soundtrack is called PreCure Sound Fantasia, which includes 36 songs from the first half of the anime. The second soundtrack, PreCure Sound Symphonia, includes 28 more songs from the second half. Three vocal albums in this show were performed by its voice actors and singers. The movie has its own soundtrack.

Other media 

An educational software title,  was released by Bandai for the Sega Beena on May 26, 2011. A video game,  was developed by Bandai for the Nintendo DS and released in Japan on August 25, 2011.

References

External links 

 Toei Animation's Suite PreCure♪ site 
 Suite PreCure site by ABC 
 Suite PreCure: Melody Collection DS game site 
 

Pretty Cure
2011 anime films
2011 Japanese television series debuts
2012 Japanese television series endings
2012 comics endings
Animated films based on animated series
Japanese-language films
Music in anime and manga
Magical girl anime and manga
Toei Animation television
Japanese animated films
Toei Animation films